In the latter half of the decade, Canada Post continued to issue a large number of stamps with different designs and themes. One of the key changes in the decade was that Canada Post issued series of stamps on a yearly basis. An example is the 400th Anniversary of the French Settlement in North America. These stamps began in 2004 and continue until 2008. Another example of an ongoing collection is the Chinese Lunar New Year stamps. The stamps have been released on an annual basis with a different animal featured every year.

Continuing the trend of putting people that are still alive on its stamps, Canada Post featured Oscar Peterson, the first member of the Order of Canada on a stamp in 2005. The year would also mark the final year of the very popular NHL legends series, which would feature legends such as 11-time Stanley Cup champion Henri Richard and Johnny Bucyk. A four stamp series in 2007 was produced with Canadian music legends. Said legends include Paul Anka, Gordon Lightfoot, Joni Mitchell, and Anne Murray, with the stamps printed on a MetalFX process.

Please see Canada Post stamp releases (2000-2004)'' for any stamps produced between 2000-2004.

2005

2006

2007

2008

2009

Upcoming releases 2009

Upcoming releases 2010

Commemorative envelopes

Conservation stamps

Conservation stamps and stamp products are issued on an annual basis. These are issued by Quebec Wildlife Foundation and help to fund initiatives tied to the preservation, restoration, and protection of Quebec's wildlife habitat. These annual issues are featured in the Canada Post Stamp Details Magazine.

Gutter Strips

Stamp survey
On an annual basis, Canadian Stamp News holds an annual survey. This gives collectors the opportunity to voice their opinions on what are their favourite stamps, and least favourite stamps. The categories include: Favourite Canadian Stamps, Most Relevant Stamps, Least Favourite Stamps, Least Relevant Stamps. The results are as follows:  
THIS IS A WORK IN PROGRESS. ANYONE WITH DETAILS IS WELCOME TO CONTRIBUTE.

2006

Favourite Canadian stamps

Most relevant stamps

Least favourite stamps

Least relevant stamps

2007

Favourite Canadian stamps

Most relevant stamps

Least favourite stamps

Least relevant stamps

Choosing Canada's stamps
Although Canada Post is responsible for stamp design and production, the corporation does not actually choose the subjects or the final designs that appear on stamps. That task falls under the jurisprudence of the Stamp Advisory Committee. Their objective is to recommend a balanced stamp program that will have broad-based appeal, regionally and culturally, reflecting Canadian history, heritage, and tradition.

Before Canada Post calls a meeting of the committee, it also welcomes suggestions for stamp subjects from Canadian citizens. Ideas for subjects that have recently appeared on a stamp are declined. The committee works two years in advance and can approve approximately 20 subjects for each year.

Once a stamp subject is selected, Canada Post's Stamp Products group conducts research. Designs are commissioned from two firms, both chosen for their expertise. The designs are presented anonymously to the committee. The committee's process and selection policy have changed little in the thirty years since it was introduced.

Any ideas for a stamp should be sent to: Chairperson of the Stamp Advisory Committee, Canada Post, 2701 Riverside Drive Suite N1070, Ottawa, ON, K1A 0B1.

Philatelic Awards
Canada Post won the Desheng Cup for best printing of a stamp at the 5th Annual Best Foreign Stamp Poll. The cup was awarded for the Big Cats Canada/China joint issue, featuring the Canadian cougar and Amur leopard. Canada Post and Bradbury Branding and Design won a Promotional or Specialty Items Award of Honour in 2006 from ACE Awards. The award was won for the Saskatchewan 1905-2005 stamp issue.

In 2006, Canada Post and the Lowe-Martin Group were honoured with three awards from the 32nd Annual IAPHC International Gallery of Superb Printing for superb craftsmanship in the production of stamps. Gold awards were received for the Year of the Dog Uncut Press Sheet and the Biosphere Reserves Canada/Ireland joint issue, featuring the Canadian cougar and Amur leopard. The IAPHC is an international organization dedicated to the development, promotion, and success of the printing and graphic art industry in society.

References

Postage stamps of Canada
Lists of postage stamps